The Wales Air Ambulance Charitable Trust, known as Wales Air Ambulance Charity (WAAC) or ( (EAAC)), is a charity air ambulance service providing a free, life-saving helicopter emergency medical service (HEMS) for the critically ill and injured in Wales. It is not funded by NHS Wales, but only by charitable donations. It also provides the Children's Wales Air Ambulance (CWAA) emergency transfer service.
The charity aims to save lives and reduce or prevent disability or suffering from critical illness and injury, by delivering a pre-hospital emergency medical service.

Service
WAAC has three helicopters and medical crews stationed at Caernarfon Airport, Welshpool Airport, and at the charity's headquarters in Dafen, near Llanelli. The team are capable of reaching a critically ill patient anywhere in Wales within 20minutes of receiving a call. Each helicopter team consists of a pilot and two medics, typically a doctor and critical care practitioner, or two critical care practitioners.

CWAA operates a fourth helicopter from Cardiff Heliport, taking children on urgent inter-hospital transfers to specialist paediatric and neonatal hospitals in the UK including Alder Hey and Great Ormond Street.

At present the aircraft operate (weather dependent) seven days a week from 08:00 to 20:00 at Caernarfon and Welshpool, 07:00 to 19:00 at Llanelli, 07:00 to 19:00 at Cardiff Heliport for patient transfer, and 19:00 to 07:00 at Cardiff Heliport to ensure that there is 24-hour emergency cover across the whole of Wales.

The charity's critical care practitioners – nurses and paramedics – and doctors are seconded from EMRTS Cymru. Pilots are provided by specialist emergency services helicopter company, Babcock Mission Critical Services Onshore.
The specialist staff can provide a range of critical care interventions, previously only found in hospitals, at the roadside, reducing the time taken for lifesaving care to take place. This includes giving a general anaesthetic to patients, providing sedation for painful procedures and undertaking critical surgical procedures.  All vehicle platforms carry a range of equipment to facilitate this including monitoring, high level portable ventilator and specialist transfer equipment. More recently, the service has commenced carrying blood products. This includes red blood cells for transfusion to bleeding patients, as well as freeze-dried plasma and fibrinogen to help with clotting and monitors and drugs to help reverse bleeding in patients who are on blood thinning medicine (warfarin) in an emergency situation.

In the year ending 31 July 2021, the charity had an income of £13.2million.
Expenditure was £11.8M, which included £7.4M operating the charitable service.

Fleet
Three of the aircraft operating for the charity are Airbus Helicopters H145.
Llanelli-based aircraft (G-WENU) has callsign Helimed 57, Welshpool (G-WOBR) is Helimed 59, while the Caernarfon-based aircraft (G-WROL) has callsign Helimed 61.

There is also a Eurocopter EC135 based in Cardiff for CWAA. This aircraft is staffed by two pilots and a specialist helicopter transfer practitioner (HTP)  a nurse or paramedic with additional training in critical care and transfer medicine. The service also works with local neonatal and paediatric specialist retrieval teams who join the crew when appropriate. This EC135 aircraft, G-WASC, callsign Helimed 67, 
has specialist equipment and can be fitted with purpose designed equipment for transfer of young children and neonates, including a transport incubator.

All helicopters are owned by Babcock Mission Critical Services Onshore, who also provide the pilots, base engineers and maintenance for the aircraft.

The three H145 aircraft are equipped for night-vision goggle (NVG) operations and have additional lighting fitted for operation in darkness.

In addition to the four aircraft, the charity runs five rapid response vehicles (RRV), spread across its four bases. These are adapted Audi Q7 with full audio and visual warning systems that carry the same standard equipment as the aircraft, and are utilised if the aircraft is offline, for example due to weather conditions, or as an additional responding resource.

See also 
Air ambulances in the United Kingdom

References

External links

Charities based in Wales
Health in Wales
Air ambulance services in Wales